This list contains songs written by  Ramón Orlando, a Dominican musician, pianist, arranger, producer, and singer. 

Many of Ramón Orlando's songs are interpreted by himself, Cuco Valoy, and their bands Los Virtuosos and La Tribu. This list include also songs interpreted by other artists such as Alberto Beltrán, Antony Santos, Elvis Crespo, Milly Quezada, Miriam Cruz, Rubby Pérez, Manny Manuel, Sergio Vargas, Sexappeal, Yoskar Sarante, and others.

See also
Ramón Orlando
Ramón Orlando discography

References

External links
Ramón Orlano at Discogs
Ramón Orlando in AllMusic

Lists of songs by songwriters